Diana Lynn Harshbarger (born January 1, 1960) is an American pharmacist, businesswoman, and politician serving as the U.S. representative for . The district is based in the Tri-Cities area in northeastern Tennessee.

Early life and career 
Harshbarger was born in Kingsport, Tennessee, and raised in nearby Bloomingdale. She is the first person in her family to graduate from high school. She earned her bachelor's degree from East Tennessee State University and her Doctor of Pharmacy from Mercer University.

Harshbarger has been a licensed pharmacist since 1987. She and her husband, Bob, operate Premier Pharmacy, a compounding pharmacy.

U.S. House of Representatives

Election

2020 

She won the 17-way August 5 Republican primary and defeated Democratic nominee Blair Walsingham in the November general election. She had effectively clinched a seat in Congress with her victory in the primary, since the 1st is one of the few ancestrally Republican districts in the South; it has been in Republican hands for all but four years since 1861, and Democrats have garnered as much as 40% of the vote only twice since 1898. When Harshbarger took office on January 3, 2021, she became the fifth woman elected to Congress from Tennessee, but only the third who was not a stand-in for her husband, after Diane Black and Marsha Blackburn. The 1st historically gives its incumbents very long tenures in Washington; Harshbarger is only the ninth person to hold the seat in 100 years.

Harshbarger focused her campaign on fixing the opioid crisis, advocating anti-abortion legislation, and protecting religious freedom. She also highlighted American dependence on Chinese pharmaceutical imports as an issue of national security. During the Republican primary, her opponents criticized her over her alleged involvement with American Inhalation Medication Specialists (AIMS), a business her husband ran that sold mislabeled pharmaceuticals from China. In 2013 Robert Harshbarger pleaded guilty to fraud charges related to the company and was sentenced to 48 months in federal prison, in addition to over $800,000 in restitution and over $400,000 in asset forfeiture. Harshbarger's campaign said she had no involvement with AIMS, despite corporate records to the contrary.

Harshbarger declined to debate her competitors during the primary and general elections.

Tenure 
On January 6, 2021, supporters of President Donald Trump stormed the U.S. Capitol during debate. Lawmakers fled to an undisclosed location for safety. Later that evening, Harshbarger joined 139 other Republican House members in voting to sustain objections to the certification of the results of the 2020 U.S. Presidential election, based on false claims of voter fraud.

In September 2021 Harshbarger co-sponsored a resolution by Marjorie Taylor Greene to impeach President Joe Biden over the withdrawal of United States troops from Afghanistan.

Committee assignments 

 Committee on Education and Labor
 Subcommittee on Health, Employment, Labor, and Pensions
 Subcommittee on Higher Education and Workforce Investment
 Committee on Homeland Security
 Subcommittee on Cybersecurity, Infrastructure Protection and Innovation
 Subcommittee on Oversight, Management and Accountability

Caucus memberships 

 GOP Doctors Caucus
 Rural Broadband Caucus
 Tennessee Valley Corridor Caucus
Republican Study Committee
Freedom Caucus

Electoral history

2020

2022

Personal life 
Harshbarger is a Baptist.

See also
Women in the United States House of Representatives

References

External links
 Representative Diana Harshbarger official U.S. House website
 Diana Harshbarger for Congress
 
 

|-

American pharmacists
East Tennessee State University alumni
Female members of the United States House of Representatives
Baptists from Tennessee
Baptists from the United States
Mercer University alumni
Living people
People from Kingsport, Tennessee
Republican Party members of the United States House of Representatives from Tennessee
Women in Tennessee politics
1960 births
21st-century American women